Jonathan Parmer Tickle (born 8 May 1974) is a British television presenter who initially rose to fame as a contestant on the fourth series of the British television show Big Brother. He appeared before this, however, as a contestant on the game show Blockbusters in 1991. He was also a co-presenter on the Sky One television series Brainiac. He has an identical twin brother and a younger sister.

Big Brother 
Tickle was allowed to return to the Big Brother house after having been evicted into the outside world (although during his second time in the house he was not eligible to win). He returned after the public voted on which evicted housemate could return to the house.

He was also a contestant on a celebrity edition of Distraction, winning  £6,500 for Cancer Research UK.

In September 2018, after ten years off television, Tickle appeared on Big Brother's Bit on the Side, to mark the final series of the reality show.

Brainiac 
Tickle received a 3rd class physics degree from the University of Leicester. He has gone on to co-present Brainiac: Science Abuse, a series of science-based shows on the UK television station Sky One.  His best-known stunt, shown on other shows such as QI and MythBusters was of Tickle walking on a pool full of custard powder and water. He was the only presenter to appear in all six seasons of the show.

Tickle has had many ideas and one of his most famous is the "time-delay toaster."  "What's the problem with toast? Two slices  pop up, you whip one out, and spread some margarine on it. But by the time you get the second, the consistency has changed. Why not have a time delay?" He is also known for the segment 'Tickle's Teaser', where he asks the viewer a tough scientific question.

References

External links

1974 births
English television presenters
English twins
Alumni of the University of Leicester
Living people
Big Brother (British TV series) contestants
Media personalities from Norwich